John Fairfax (1804–1877) was an English-born Australian journalist.

John Fairfax may also refer to:
John Fairfax (delegate) (1762–1843), manager for George Washington who became a planter and politician in what became West virginia
John Fairfax (minister) (1623–1700), English ejected minister
John Fairfax, 11th Lord Fairfax of Cameron (1830–1900), British peer with American citizenship
John Fairfax (poet) (1930–2009), English poet
John Fairfax (rower) (1937–2012), British ocean rower and adventurer

See also
John Fairfax Holdings (founded 1841), predecessor of Australian company Fairfax Media